Lavazza is a surname, which may refer to:

 Luigi Lavazza (1859 - 1949), an Italian businessman and founder of Lavazza coffee
 Emilio Lavazza (1932 - 2010), another Italian businessman

See also 
 Lavazza (Luigi Lavazza S.p.A.), an Italian manufacturer of coffee products founded in Turin in 1895 by Luigi Lavazza
Barista Lavazza (India), a chain of espresso bars in India, headquartered in Delhi

Italian-language surnames